Ghiath Jeraatli (born 1950) has been a Syrian Minister of State since 2011.

Jeraatli was born in 1950. He earned a degree in architecture at the University of Aleppo in 1975. He worked in an enterprise investment in the Euphrates basin in 1975, and practiced engineering work in his own office since 1981. He is a member of the General Conference of the Syndicate of Engineers, a member of the Department of Architecture and a member of the Committee on Media and Publishing in the union branch in Aleppo. He holds the rank of engineer opinion by resolution 1997 of the Engineers Association.

See also
Cabinet of Syria

References

External links
Minister of State Ghiath Jeraatli, SANA
Biography of the new Syrian government 2011 - the names and lives of government ministers, Syria FM, 17 April 2011

1950 births
Living people
Syrian ministers of state
University of Aleppo alumni